Mazandaran Mahalleh (also Romanized as Māzandarān Maḩalleh) is a village in Chini Jan Rural District, in the Central District of Rudsar County, Gilan Province, Iran. At the 2006 census, its population was 85, in 24 families.

References 

Populated places in Rudsar County